"Sing-A-Long" is a song by UK garage duo Shanks & Bigfoot, released on 17 July 2000. The song did not match the success of their previous UK number-one hit, "Sweet like Chocolate", but was still a hit single, peaking at number 12 on the UK Singles Chart and number one on both the UK Dance and Independent charts. Terri Walker provides vocals on the song.

Track listing
European CD maxi-single
 "Sing-A-Long" (Shanks & Bigfoot original 7-inch) – 3:29
 "Sing-A-Long" (Wideboys Vocal Remix) – 4:43
 "Sing-A-Long" (Mutiny Dub) – 6:21
 "Sing-A-Long" (Junkie XL Dub) – 10:25
 "Sing-A-Long" (Shanks & Bigfoot original extended) – 6:44
 "Sing-A-Long" (Mutiny Vocal) – 8:56

Charts

References

2000 songs
2000 singles
Shanks & Bigfoot songs
UK Independent Singles Chart number-one singles
Jive Records singles
Zomba Group of Companies singles